Foreign relations exist between the Commonwealth of Australia and the Republic of Turkey. Diplomatic relations between the two countries were established in 1967. Australia has had an embassy in Ankara since 1968, a consulate-general in Istanbul and a consulate in Çanakkale. Turkey has had an embassy in Canberra since 1967 and two consulates-general in Melbourne and Sydney.

History

Gallipoli campaign
The first encounter of Turkey and Australia was on the battlefields of Çanakkale. Allied troops from the British Empire,  France and Russia landed in Gallipoli to secure passage through the Dardanelles, providing a naval route to Russia, an allied power.

The history between the two countries constitutes a strong foundation to further strengthen and deepen their relations in every field. The warm sentiments between Turkish and Australian nations were exemplified in the message of Mustafa Kemal Atatürk, which was sent to the Australian and New Zealander mothers in 1934 and is as follows:
"Those heroes that shed their blood and lost their lives… you are now lying in the soil of a friendly country.  Therefore rest in peace.  There is no difference between the Johnnies and the Mehmets where they lie side by side here in this country of ours… You the mothers who sent their sons from far away countries, wipe away your tears. Your sons are now lying in our bosom and are in peace.  Having lost their lives on this land they have become our sons as well."

The Çanakkale Battles are commemorated every year in Çanakkale on 24–25 April, with a wide participation from Australian and Turkish people alike. In Australia and New Zealand, as well as several other South Pacific nations, a public holiday is held for the event, known as Anzac Day. It is an important date on the Australian and New Zealand calendars, commemorating the sacrifices made by Australian and New Zealand soldiers in all battles and wars. Traditionally in these countries, a memorial service is observed at around 5:30 AM, known as a Dawn Service. This is a symbolic gesture to the troops that landed on the Gallipoli Peninsula at dawn. In 1985, 70 years after the battle, the Turkish government officially recognized the name ANZAC Cove, the location where the troops landed.

Since World War I

In March 2019, Australian Prime Minister Scott Morrison condemned "reckless" and "highly offensive" comments made by Turkey president Recep Tayyip Erdoğan.  Erdoğan repeatedly showed video taken by the Christchurch mosque shooter to his supporters at campaign rallies for  local elections and said Australians and New Zealanders who came to Turkey with anti-Muslim sentiments "would be sent back in coffins like their grandfathers were" during the Gallipoli campaign of World War I.

See also 
 Foreign relations of Australia
 Foreign relations of Turkey 
 Turkish Australians

References

External links 
 Australian Ministry of Foreign Affairs about relations with Turkey

 
Turkey
Bilateral relations of Turkey